The siege of Petra took place in 541 when the Sasanian Empire, under King of Kings Khosrow I, besieged the town of Petra in Lazica, held by the Eastern Roman (Byzantine) Empire. The Sasanians successfully captured the fortress.

Background

The 541 capture of Petra was part of Khosrow I's invasion of Lazica. This campaign commenced when the Sasanian king was invited by the local king Gubazes II.

The siege

After passing through the difficult terrain of Lazica, the Sasanian forces met and joined Gubazes II. The main objective of the campaign was to capture Petra, where the magister militum per Armeniam John Tzibus had concentrated his forces and had established a monopoly in the port city. Khosrow sent a detachment under Aniabedes to attack the fort, where he found the fort apparently deserted. A detachment that was sent to destroy the gate with a battering-ram was defeated as the Byzantine forces quickly rushed out of the gate in a surprise raid. The Sasanians then camped near the fortifications and began a regular siege. On the following day, the Sasanians went completely around the fort and began shooting with arrows, and the Byzantines responded by shooting with arrows and war engines. The Byzantine commander John was killed by an arrow in the neck, demoralizing the defenders. Petra featured a rough terrain and unusually strong defensive towers, which, instead of being hollow, were made of solid stone to a great height. Nevertheless, the Sasanians managed to bring down one of the two great defensive towers through mining operations: much of the lower stones were removed and replaced by wood by the miners, and the tower fell as the flames slowly loosened the upper layers of stone; the tower was suddenly brought down and the Sasanians entered the fort through the walls. The besieged forces then surrendered and came to terms. The possessions of the rich commander/merchant John Tzibus were seized, but everything else was untouched, and the surviving Byzantine forces joined the Sasanian army. A Sasanian garrison was established in Petra. An account cited that in the course of the siege, many Persian soldiers died due to the difficult terrain, an epidemic, and lack of supplies.

Leif Inge Ree Petersen notes that Roman commanders were killed (without specifying names) during the defense of Petra.

References

Sources
 
 
 
 
 
 

540s conflicts
Petra 541
Petra 541
Petra 541
6th century in the Byzantine Empire
Lazic War
6th century in Iran
540s in the Byzantine Empire
Sieges of Petra, Lazica